Leopold Danis (17 April 1901 – 1940) was an Austrian footballer. He played in three matches for the Austria national football team in 1924.

References

External links
 

1901 births
1940 deaths
Austrian footballers
Austria international footballers
Place of birth missing
Association football forwards

1. Simmeringer SC players
Wiener Sport-Club players